The Moscow Cable Car is a cable car across the Moskva River in Moscow.

The new cable car project was initiated in January 2017. Construction began in May 2017 and was completed in November 2018. The first Moscow cable car is 720 metres long, and there are three stations for each.

The Vorobyovy Gory station is located on Kosygina Street near the observation point. In winter, this area is a ski slope. The second station, named Novaya Liga, is located on the Vorobyovskaya Embankment. It is mostly used by skiers and snowboarders to get back up the hill. Luzhniki station is located on the Luzhnetskaya Embankment near the stadium.

There are 35 covered gondolas with eight seats each. The gondolas were designed by Porsche Design Studio, and have media screens, LED illumination, and hooks for bicycles, skis, and snowboards. Passengers are also able to use audio guides in four languages (English, Chinese, German, and Russian).

There are also 10 additional chairlifts with four seats each for athletes. They run on the smaller cable section between Vorobyovskaya Embankment and the observation point.

The cable cars can carry up to 1,600 passengers every hour and it runs all year. The system is built to withstand wind and precipitation.

Moscow’s new cable cars has several functions: first, they serve as a tourist attraction because of their city and Moskva River views. Secondly, they are used as transport because it only takes five minutes to ride from Vorobyovy Gory to Luzhniki Stadium. Additionally it is used as a chairlift for skiers and snowboarders.

References

External links

Official website

Transport in Moscow
Aerial lifts in Russia